Liu Jian (刘坚) was the head of Shanghai Volkswagen, a joint venture with Volkswagen and the largest producer of cars in China. He was killed during a test drive in China on July 19, 2010. Four others were killed in the crash.

In 2008, Liu introduced the concept of renewable resources to the manufacture of cars in China and worked to make Volkswagen the official vehicle of the 2008 Beijing Olympic Games.

External links
Yahoo! Finance: SAIC Motor Corporation profile
China Daily: Volkswagen's 'strategy 2018' drives sustainable future
World Car Fans:Volkswagen unveils first convoy-vehicles for Olympic torch relay
Bloomberg: Shanghai Volkswagen's General Manager Liu Jian Killed in Traffic Accident

Volkswagen Group executives
2010 deaths
Year of birth missing